A Musical Joke K. 522, (Divertimento for two horns and string quartet) is a composition by Wolfgang Amadeus Mozart; the composer entered it in his  (Catalogue of All My Works) on June 14, 1787. Commentators have opined that the piece's purpose is satirical – that "[its] harmonic and rhythmic gaffes serve to parody the work of incompetent composers" – though Mozart himself is not known to have revealed his actual intentions.

English name

The title A Musical Joke might be a poor rendering of the German original: Spaß does not necessarily connote the jocular, for which the word Scherz would more likely be used. In Fritz Spiegl's view, a more accurate translation would be Some Musical Fun. The sometimes-mentioned nicknames "Dorfmusikantensextett" ("village musicians' sextet") and "Bauernsinfonie" ("farmers' symphony") were added after Mozart's death.

Structure and compositional elements

The piece consists of four movements and takes about 20 minutes to perform.
 Allegro (sonata form), F major
 Menuetto and trio, F major (trio in B-flat major)
 Adagio cantabile, C major
 Presto (sonata rondo form), F major

Compositorial comedic devices include:
secondary dominants replacing necessary subdominant chords;
discords in the horns;
parallel fifths
whole tone scales in the violin's high register;
clumsy orchestration, backing a thin melodic line with a heavy, monotonous accompaniment in the last movement;
going to the wrong keys for a sonata-form structure (the first movement, for example, never succeeds in modulating to the dominant, and simply jumps there instead after a few failed attempts);
starting the slow movement in the wrong key (G major instead of C major);
a pathetic attempt at a fugato, also in the last movement.

The piece is notable for one of the earliest known uses of polytonality (though not the earliest, being predated by Heinrich Ignaz Franz Biber's Battalia), creating the gesture of complete collapse at the finale. This may be intended to produce the impression of grossly out-of-tune string playing, since the horns alone conclude in the tonic key. The lower strings behave as if the tonic has become B-flat, while the violins and violas switch to G major, A major and E-flat major, respectively.

For a reading of some elements of this composition to the sounds made by Mozart's pet bird, see Mozart's starling.

Whole-tone scales and polytonality are foreign to music of the Classical era. However, these became common for early 20th-century composers like Claude Debussy and Igor Stravinsky, who were searching for a new musical language. In this later context, these were legitimate new techniques in serious music. In Mozart's time, however, these non-classical elements gave the piece its comedy, expressing the composer's humor.

References

External links

, Dennis Brain, Neill Sanders (horn); Manoug Parikian (violin); London Philharmonic Orchestra, Guido Cantelli

Humor in classical music
Serenades and divertimenti by Wolfgang Amadeus Mozart
1787 compositions
Compositions in F major